Mithuna strigifera is a moth in the subfamily Arctiinae first described by George Hampson in 1900. It is found in Sikkim, India.

References

Moths described in 1900
Lithosiini